Bhumi Phala Stadium is a football stadium in the town of Temanggung, Indonesia. The stadium has a capacity of 7,000 people. It is the home venue of Persitema Temanggung.

References

Sports venues in Indonesia
Football venues in Indonesia